Swamp People is an American reality series that was first broadcast on History on August 22, 2010. The show follows the day-to-day activities people living in the swamps of the Atchafalaya River Basin who hunt American alligators for a living.

As of February 3, 2023, 233 episodes of Swamp People have aired, currently in the 14th season.

Series overview

Episodes

Season 1 (2010)

Season 2 (2011)

Season 3 (2012)

Season 4 (2013–14)

Season 5 (2014)

Season 6 (2015)

Season 7 (2016)

Season 8 (2017)

Season 9 (2018)

Season 10 (2019)

Season 11 (2020)

Season 12 (2021)

Season 13 (2022)

Season 14

References

External links
 
 

Swamp People